Quthing Airport  is an airport serving the settlement of Quthing, Lesotho.

See also
Transport in Lesotho
List of airports in Lesotho

References

External links
 Quthing Airport
 OurAirports - Quthing
OpenStreetMap - Quthing
 Google Earth

Airports in Lesotho